Windy City Jamboree was an American popular music program on the DuMont Television Network from March 19 to June 18, 1950. The show aired live from the Rainbow Gardens nightclub in Chicago, Illinois, on Sunday nights from 8pm to 10 pm ET, using the facilities of DuMont affiliate WGN-TV.

The cast included Danny O'Neil, Gloria Van, Jane Brockman and Bud Tygett, Jimmy McPartland, Dick Edwards, "Woo Woo" Stephens, Paula Raye, John Dalz, and the Julian Stockdale Orchestra.

See also
List of programs broadcast by the DuMont Television Network
List of surviving DuMont Television Network broadcasts

Bibliography
David Weinstein, The Forgotten Network: DuMont and the Birth of American Television (Philadelphia: Temple University Press, 2004) 
Alex McNeil, Total Television, Fourth edition (New York: Penguin Books, 1980) 
Tim Brooks and Earle Marsh, The Complete Directory to Prime Time Network TV Shows, Third edition (New York: Ballantine Books, 1964)

External links
 
DuMont historical website

DuMont Television Network original programming
Black-and-white American television shows
1950 American television series debuts
1950 American television series endings
1950s American variety television series
American country music
Country music television series
English-language television shows